is a Japanese artistic gymnast. She is the 2014 and 2021 Japanese national all-around bronze medalist and the 2014 Japanese balance beam champion. She was named as a member of the Japanese team for the 2014 World Championships and the 2020 Summer Olympics.

Career

Junior

2013 
Hiraiwa made her international debut at the International Gymnix in Montreal, Canada. She finished 21st in the all-around, sixth on balance beam, and fifth on floor.

Senior

2014 
Hiraiwa made her senior debut at the 2014 All-Japan Championships in May. She improved from her eighth-place finish in qualifications to earn the bronze medal behind Natsumi Sasada and Asuka Teramoto. Hiraiwa then finished 11th at the NHK Cup in June. She captured the balance beam title at the All-Japan Event Championships in July. As a result, Hiraiwa was named to the Japanese team for the 2014 World Championships alongside Sasada, Teramoto, Yu Minobe, Mai Murakami, and Wakana Inoue, where she was the youngest member.

At the World Championships, Hiraiwa broke her right middle finger and metacarpal bone while training on the uneven bars and returned home to Japan for further examination and treatment; she was replaced by Azumi Ishikura. Although she recovered from the hand injury, the overall experience of her sudden withdrawal caused her to suffer mental setbacks. Hiraiwa also suffered a series of injuries during the following years and described entering a "slump" in her career.

2015 
Hiraiwa finished 13th in all-around qualifications at the 2015 All-Japan Championships, before going on to finish last in the final. At the NHK Trophy a month later, which combined scores from All-Japan, she improved slightly to finish 21st.

2016 
Hiraiwa began her season by competing three events (excluding uneven bars) at the WOGA Classic in Frisco, Texas, winning the silver medal on floor behind Canadian gymnast Shallon Olsen. She then competed alongside Nagi Kajita and Sae Miyakawa at the International Gymnix in March, finishing sixth as a team. Individually, Hiraiwa was 15th in the all-around, seventh on balance beam, and eighth on floor exercise.

Hiraiwa missed the 2016 All-Japan Championships due to injury, but recovered to compete on uneven bars and balance beam at the All-Japan Event Championships the following month. She missed qualifying to the uneven bars final, but reached the balance beam final in fifth place; she finished fourth in the final.

2017 
Hiraiwa finished 33rd in qualifications at the 2017 All-Japan Championships and did not advance to the final. She competed only on balance beam at the All-Japan Event Championships, but did not advance to the final. Competing for Mukogawa Women's University at the All-Japan Student Championships, Hiraiwa finished fifth in the all-around and won silvers on vault, balance beam, and floor exercise. She competed three events (excluding uneven bars) for Mukogawa Women's University at the All-Japan Team Championships to help the team finish 14th overall.

2018 
Hiraiwa struggled at the 2018 All-Japan Championships, finishing 55th in qualification and failing to advance to the final for a second year in a row. She competed on balance beam and floor at the All-Japan Event Championships, qualifying in third for balance beam and narrowly missing the floor final due to an out-of-bounds penalty. Hiraiwa captured the bronze medal behind Mai Murakami and Asuka Teramoto in the final, her first national medal since 2014. She then competed three events for Mukogawa Women's University at the All-Japan Team Championships, including the highest score on beam and second-highest score on floor, to help the team finish seventh overall.

2019 
Following a career-worst finish at the 2018 All-Japan Championships, Hiraiwa transferred from her college team, where she was coached by Japanese national team head coach Kazukuni Ohno, to train with 1996 Olympian Risa Toyoshima (née Sugawara) at the Toda Sports Club. Hiraiwa did not compete at the 2019 All-Japan Championships, but returned to compete on balance beam and floor at the All-Japan Event Championships in June. She placed 21st on beam, but qualified in first on floor. However, Hiraiwa finished fifth in the floor final.

Hiraiwa credits the transfer to Toyoshima for gradually helping her overcome her mental struggles and fear stemming from her 2014 injury. She stated that Toyoshima taught her "doing [her] own gymnastics is more important than the result" and that Toyoshima's guidance allowed her to replace her fear with the "joy of gymnastics" again.

2020 
After the COVID-19 pandemic limited international competitive opportunities, Hiraiwa began the season at the All-Japan Senior Championships where she surprised to win silver behind Mai Murakami and ahead of Hitomi Hatakeda. She earned the highest score on balance beam and second-highest score on floor behind Murakami en route to the silver medal. Hiraiwa finished only sixth at the All-Japan Championships in December due to issues on uneven bars resulting in a 19th-place finish during qualifications. However, she rebounded during the all-around final to tie Hatakeda for the second-highest score of the day behind Murakami.

2021 
During the lead-up to the competition season, Hiraiwa experienced interruptions in her training due to the medical state of emergency induced by the COVID-19 pandemic in Japan. She opened her season at the 2021 All-Japan Championships, where she finished third in both qualifications and the all-around final to win the bronze medal behind Mai Murakami and Hitomi Hatakeda. It was her first time on the all-around podium since capturing bronze in her senior debut seven years ago. Hiraiwa then repeated her bronze medal performance at the NHK Trophy, again behind Murakami and Hatakeda, to secure one of the automatic berths on the Japanese Olympic team for the postponed 2020 Summer Olympics. After being named to the team, she noted that she "liked gymnastics more [now]" and thanked her coach, Risa Toyoshima, for rekindling her motivation to pursue the Olympic team. The Olympics will be Hiraiwa's first international assignment since 2016.

Competitive history

Junior

Senior

References

External links 
 

1998 births
Living people
Japanese female artistic gymnasts
Gymnasts from Tokyo
Olympic gymnasts of Japan
Gymnasts at the 2020 Summer Olympics
21st-century Japanese women